Jesse David Makarounas (born 18 April 1994) is an Australian professional football (soccer) player who plays as a midfielder for Moreland City.

Early life 
Born in Darwin, Makarounas played youth football at the WA NTC and AIS Football Program before making his professional debut for Perth Glory in 2012. In 2013, he moved to Melbourne Victory, where he played until 2016.

Makarounas made numerous appearances for the Australia under-17 and Australia under-20 sides.

Early life
Makarounas was born in Darwin to a Greek father and an Italian mother.

Club career

Perth Glory
On 29 April 2011, Makarounas signed for Perth Glory having previously played for the Australian Institute of Sport in the National Youth League. Jesse made his professional debut, and debut for Perth Glory on 24 March 2012, coming on as a half-time substitute for Steven McGarry, in 4–2 home win against Melbourne Victory.

Melbourne Victory
In January 2013 Makarounas signed with rival club Melbourne Victory.

Makarounas was released by Melbourne Victory on 28 May 2016.

Adelaide United
On 11 July 2016, Adelaide United announced that they had signed Makarounas on a one-year contract. Makarounas scored his first A-League goal in Adelaide's first game of the 2016–17 A-League, capitalising on a defensive error to score the equaliser in a draw with Newcastle Jets. However, by the end of 2017, Makarounas had lost his position in the Adelaide side, featuring only once between December 2016 and March 2017. Makarounas departed Adelaide at the end of the 2016–17 season.

Moreland City
Makarounas joined Moreland City on 13 February 2018 alongside Christopher Cristaldo, hours before the transfer deadline.

Career statistics

Honours

Club
Melbourne Victory
 A-League Premiership: 2014–15
 FFA Cup: 2015

References

External links
 
 

1994 births
Living people
Australian soccer players
Australia youth international soccer players
Australia under-20 international soccer players
Australian Institute of Sport soccer players
Sportspeople from Darwin, Northern Territory
Association football midfielders
Perth Glory FC players
A-League Men players
Melbourne Victory FC players
Adelaide United FC players
Australian people of Greek descent
Australian people of Italian descent